Lee Jung-Youl (born August 16, 1981) is a South Korean football player who plays for Daejeon Citizen.

His previous clubs were Incheon United, Seongnam Ilhwa Chunma and Chunnam Dragons.

He was part of the South Korea football team in 2004 Summer Olympics, who finished second in Group A, making it through to the next round, before being defeated by silver medal winners Paraguay.

Club career statistics

References

External links 
 

1981 births
Living people
Association football central defenders
South Korean footballers
FC Seoul players
Incheon United FC players
Seongnam FC players
Jeonnam Dragons players
Daejeon Hana Citizen FC players
K League 1 players
Footballers at the 2004 Summer Olympics
Olympic footballers of South Korea
Footballers from Seoul